Ngô Thị Mân is the current spouse of Vietnam's de facto leader Nguyễn Phú Trọng, who has served as the General Secretary of the Communist Party of Vietnam since 2011. Additionally, she is the de facto First Lady of Vietnam during her husband's presidency from 2018 to 2021. She is rumored to have maintained an austere lifestyle despite being married to the most powerful man in Vietnam.

References 

Spouses of Vietnamese leaders
21st-century Vietnamese women politicians
Living people
People from Hanoi
Year of birth missing (living people)